Timbres, espace, mouvement (Timbre, space, movement) is a work for orchestra composed by Henri Dutilleux in 1978.  Dutilleux subtitled the work La nuit étoilée (The Starry Night), in reference to the 1889 painting by Vincent van Gogh.  The composer wanted to translate in his composition the "almost cosmic whirling effect which (the painting) produces".  Dutilleux dedicated the work to the memory of Charles Münch and to Mstislav Rostropovich, the conductor of its premiere.

Mstislav Rostropovich commissioned the work, and conducted the premiere with Washington National Symphony Orchestra on 7 November 1978.  Dutilleux revised the work in 1990 with the addition of an interlude for 12 cellos between the two original movements.  The work is approximately 20 minutes' duration.

Instrumentation 
The instrumentation consists of:

Woodwinds
2 piccolos (doubling on flute)
 2 flutes (flute 2 doubles on alto flute)
 3 oboes
 oboe d'amore
 E-flat clarinet
 2 clarinets in A
 bass clarinet
 3 bassoons
 contrabassoon
Brass
 4 horns
 3 trumpets
 3 trombones
 tuba

Percussion

timpani
 crotales

 suspended cymbals
 tam-tams
 bongos
 tom-toms
 snare drum
 marimba
 glockenspiel

Keyboards
 celesta

Strings
 harp

 12 celli
 10 double basses

Dutilleux has omitted violins and violas from his instrumentation. Their absence was meant to translate the impression of relative emptiness and immobility conveyed by the lower half of the painting. On the other hand, the wind instruments and percussions are particularly prominent. Their solos represent the movements of the clouds and the light of the stars and the moon. Space is represented by an unusual distribution of the celli. They are placed at the foreground in a half circle around the conductor. The movement is symbolized by the alternation of static episodes and whirling solos.

References

External links
 Boston Symphony Orchestra, programme note for 25-27 February 2016 concert

Sources
 Henri Dutilleux:  His Life and Works,  Caroline Potter 
 Henri Dutilleux: Timbres, espace, mouvement on max-texier.ircam.fr
 Dutilleux, Henri at The Living Composers Project Contains information on orchestral composition

Compositions by Henri Dutilleux
1978 compositions
Compositions for symphony orchestra
Music commissioned by Mstislav Rostropovich